Liane Brauch "Lee" Russell (August 27, 1923 – July 20, 2019) was an Austrian-born American geneticist and conservationist. Her studies in mammalian genetics provided the basis for understanding the chromosomic basis for sex determination in mammals and the effects occasioned by radiation, drugs, fuels and waste on mice. Her research allowed better understanding of genetic processes in mammals, mutagenesis and teratogenesis effects on mammals, and knowledge of how these processes can be prevented and avoided. She determined that developing embryos were most vulnerable to the effects of radiation during the first seven weeks of pregnancy and therefore recommended that non-urgent diagnostic X-rays be taken in the 14 days after the onset of a woman's menstrual period, a standard that became internationally accepted in radiological practice. She was also the first to discover that the Y chromosome determines maleness in mammals.

Her conservation activities resulted in the protection of many wild and scenic places, especially those near her adopted home of East Tennessee.

Early life 
Russell was born as Liane Brauch in 1923 in Vienna, Austria, to a Jewish household, the oldest of three children to Clara (Starer) and Arthur Brauch. Her father was a chemist and her mother was a singing teacher. From the age of 3 to 15, the family lived on the Wiedner Hauptstrasse, not far from the Vienna Opera. There were frequent musical gatherings in the apartment, and the family enjoyed skiing and other outings in the Alps. One of her childhood playmates was first cousin, Robert Starer, Austrian-born American composer and pianist. Her somewhat idyllic childhood abruptly came to an end on the evening of March 12, 1938, but her family stayed in Vienna even after the Anschluss. Through a secret scheme, which involved the surrender of her father's business to the Nazis, the immediate family (father, mother, younger sister and younger brother) were able to escape to London. She moved to the United States in 1941 and became a naturalized American citizen in 1946.

She met zoologist William L. Russell during a college summer school program, where he was her mentor. They married and worked together as geneticists at Jackson Laboratory and Oak Ridge National Laboratory. Together they had two children, a son, David "Ace" (b. 1950) and a daughter, Evelyn (b. 1952).

Education 
Russell completed her secondary schooling in England. After the family moved to the United States, she earned an A.B. from Hunter College in New York City in 1945 and her Ph.D. in Zoology in 1949 at the University of Chicago.

Her first job was baby sitting while she studied in college; after that she worked as a receptionist in a doctor's office after class.

Career 
Russell began her career as a research assistant at Jackson Memorial Laboratory from 1943 to 1947, and worked as a fellow at the University of Chicago. In 1947, she moved to Oak Ridge National Laboratory, where she eventually became a Senior Corporate Fellow and Section Head. Russell conducted genetics research focused on radiation-induced mutations. She and her husband established the "mouse house," a colony of more than 200,000 mutant mice bred to study the effects of radiation exposure. The extensive colony helped drive mammalian genetics research for decades. She served as scientific advisor for the U.S. delegation at the first Atoms for Peace Conference held in Geneva in 1955. In 1973 she was the first woman to receive the internationally awarded Roentgen Medal. Russell served as head of the Mammalian Genetics & Development Section between 1975 and 1995. Under her guidance, this Section expanded its research, studying the genetic effects of chemicals from drugs, fuels and waste on mice. Her studies allowed her to move from classic genetics to molecular analysis. Russell was elected to the National Academy of Sciences in 1986. In 1993 she received the Enrico Fermi Award, the U.S. Department of Energy's (DOE's) highest research honor, for her "outstanding contributions to genetics and radiation biology, including her discovery of the chromosomal basis for sex determination in mammals and her contributions to our knowledge of the effects of radiation on the developing embryo and fetus." Russell has more than 150 publications. In 2001, Oak Ridge National Laboratory opened the William L. and Liane B. Russell Laboratory for Comparative and Functional Genomics. She retired in 2002. In 2013, Oak Ridge National Laboratory created the Liane B. Russell Distinguished Early Career Fellowship to assist young researchers.

Activism 

Russell was also a conservationist working for protection of wilderness and national lands and rivers. In 1966 she helped to organize the Tennessee Citizens for Wilderness Planning (TCWP). In 1976 TCWP helped to obtain protection of the 125,000-acre Big South Fork National River and Recreation Area and obtain National Wild and Scenic River designation for the Obed River. In 1992 Russell received the National Parks Conservation Association's (NPCA's) Marjory Stoneman Douglas award.

Summary 
Liane Brauch Russel was born in 1923 to a Jewish family in Vienna, Austria. Her father was a chemical engineer while her mother taught singing, and she was the oldest out of her two other siblings. As a child, her parents were very encouraging of Liane's inquiring mind and constantly reminded her that girls could do anything boys could do. However, despite her parents' evident kind-heartedness, the world was at a loss for morality during the later years of Liane's childhood. In 1938, Austria was annexed by the Nazis, and due to Liane's Jewish heritage, she and her family were forced to flee Austria to London. Liane and her family lost their house and possessions, and her father even lost his entire business to the Nazi regime. After several years in England, Liane moved to the United States, where she decided to further her education at Hunter College in New York City. She studied chemistry and biology and completed a summer research assistantship at Jackson Laboratory, a biomedical research institution that focuses on studying human biology and genomics. Interestingly enough, through the assistantship, her supervisor, William Russel, a leading geneticist at the time, would later become both Liane's husband and research partner. Upon graduation from Hunter College in 1945, Liane went back to Jackson Laboratory before moving to the University of Chicago to pursue her Ph.D. in Zoology. After initiating her Ph.D., Liane went to work at the Oak Ridge National Laboratory in Tennessee, which played a vital role in the development of nuclear weapons through the Manhattan Project in WWII. Liane was fortunate enough to work alongside her husband, William Russell, as they both had a mission to study the effects of radiation exposure on mice. Mice share various genetic qualities with humans and thus were the perfect test subjects for Liane's radiation experiments. The essential pain point Liane was looking to solve was that the current information surrounding the effects of radiation on congenital disabilities was insufficient and inconclusive. Essentially, Liane was looking to innovate on recent research and prove the harmful effects that radiation can have on humans. Thus, she began researching how radiation affects mice embryos at certain stages in their development. Through this research, Liane discovered a variety of different deformities that would arise within the embryos at different stages of growth. Through Liane's findings, she determined that the most critical time of human gestation is within the first two to six weeks, during which most women do not even know they are pregnant. Both Liane and her husband published a paper describing their findings. The report recommended that women who may be pregnant only receive specific radiological procedures during the two weeks after their last menstrual cycle when they are most likely not pregnant. The paper was published in 1952 and received heavy criticism and controversy from radiologists. However, despite heavy criticism, the innovative research that both Liane and her husband performed became known as the 14-day rule and became a radiological practice accepted in almost every country. And to this day, this innovative rule is still a prominent rule among radiologists internationally. These findings have protected millions of pregnant women from premature radiation procedures that would've had detrimental effects on their pregnancies and children in the 1950s and the present day. Furthermore, Liane has received a variety of awards for her research. She was awarded the Roentgen Medal in 1973, became a member of the National Academy of Sciences in 1986, and received the Enrico Fermi Award from the Department of Energy in 1994. Likewise, the Oak Ridge National Laboratory created the Liane B. Russell Distinguished Early Career Fellowship, a program primarily for minority and female scientists who help them get early exposure to various scientific fields. Inevitably, Liane Russell played a pivotal role in the radiation field and discovered its harmful effects on developing embryos. And her innovative research has been able to save lives and improve the overarching areas of science and medicine both during her life and after.

Awards 
Roentgen Medal, 1973
Hunter College Hall of Fame, 1979
Marjory Stoneman Douglas Award, 1992
Environmental Mutagen Society Award, 1993
Enrico Fermi award in 1993
 National Academy of Sciences, Election Year: 1986.

References

External links
 Liane B. Russell, ORNL Corporate Fellow
 Dr. Liane B. Russell, Oak Ridge National Laboratory
 Liane B. Russell. National Academy of Sciences, Member Directory.
 Tennessee Citizens for Wilderness Planning
Liane Russell's Interview (Oral History), Voices of the Manhattan Project

1923 births
2019 deaths
American geneticists
21st-century American zoologists
Jewish emigrants from Austria to the United States after the Anschluss
Hunter College alumni
University of Chicago alumni
University of Chicago faculty
20th-century American women scientists
American women geneticists
Women zoologists
Oak Ridge National Laboratory people
Enrico Fermi Award recipients
American women academics
21st-century American women